L.R. Doty was a Great Lakes steamship launched in May 1893 at West Bay City, Michigan. She was last seen afloat October 25, 1898 north of Milwaukee, Wisconsin, during a violent storm on Lake Michigan, with winds reaching . The ship was witnessed foundering at the stern by a passenger of the four-masted schooner Olive Jeanette which was being towed by the Doty until the tow line broke from the force of the storm. Seventeen crew members died.

The first divers to reach and film the Doty were Tracy Xelowski, John Scoles and John Janzen.

Coincidentally, seven years later on September 30, 1905, the L.R. Doty sister ship the Iosco also sank while towing the Olive Jeanette. However, on this occasion both vessels were lost to the waters of Lake Superior.

References

External links
 
 

1893 ships
Ships built in Bay City, Michigan
Shipwrecks of Lake Michigan
Shipwrecks of the Wisconsin coast
Steamships of the United States
Merchant ships of the United States
Maritime incidents in 1898
Great Lakes freighters
Wreck diving sites